Robert Todd Lincoln (August 1, 1843 – July 26, 1926) was an American lawyer, businessman, and politician. He was the eldest son of President Abraham Lincoln and Mary Todd Lincoln. Robert Lincoln became a business lawyer and company president, and served as U.S. Secretary of War and U.S. Ambassador to the United Kingdom.

Lincoln was born in Springfield, Illinois, and graduated from Harvard College before serving on the staff of Ulysses S. Grant as a captain in the Union Army in the closing days of the American Civil War. After the war was over, he married Mary Eunice Harlan, and they had three children together. Following completion of his law school studies in Chicago, he built a successful law practice, and became wealthy representing corporate clients.

Active in Republican politics, and a tangible symbol of his father's legacy, Lincoln was often spoken of as a possible candidate for office, including the presidency, but never took steps to mount a campaign. The one office to which he was elected was town supervisor of South Chicago, which he held from 1876 to 1877; the town later became part of the city of Chicago. Lincoln served as United States Secretary of War in the administration of James A. Garfield, continuing under Chester A. Arthur, and as United States Minister to the United Kingdom in the Benjamin Harrison administration.

Lincoln became general counsel of the Pullman Palace Car Company, and after founder George Pullman died in 1897, Lincoln assumed the company's presidency. After retiring from this position in 1911, Lincoln served as chairman of the board until 1922. In Lincoln's later years, he resided at homes in Washington, D.C., and Manchester, Vermont; the Manchester home, Hildene, was added to the National Register of Historic Places in 1977. In 1922, he took part in the dedication ceremonies for the Lincoln Memorial. Lincoln died at Hildene on July 26, 1926, six days before his 83rd birthday, and was buried at Arlington National Cemetery.

Early life
Robert Todd Lincoln was born in Springfield, Illinois, on August 1, 1843, to Abraham Lincoln and Mary Todd Lincoln. He had three younger brothers, Edward, William, and Tad. By the time Lincoln was born, his father had become a well-known member of the Whig political party and had previously served as a member of the Illinois state legislature for four terms. He was named after his maternal grandfather, Robert Smith Todd.

When his father became president of the United States on the eve of the Civil War, Lincoln was the only one of the president's three children to be largely on his own. He took the Harvard College entrance examination in 1859, but failed fifteen out of the sixteen subjects. He was then enrolled at Phillips Exeter Academy to further prepare for attending college, and he graduated in 1860. Admitted to Harvard, he graduated in 1864, having been elected vice-president of the Hasty Pudding Club, and was a member of the Delta Kappa Epsilon (Alpha chapter) fraternity. Welsh author Jan Morris wrote that Robert Lincoln, "having failed fifteen out of sixteen subjects in the Harvard entrance examination, got in at last and emerged an unsympathetic bore."

Civil War years
After graduating from Harvard, Lincoln enrolled at Harvard Law School. When he initially expressed interest in the law school to his father, President Lincoln made reference to his own pleasant, but informal legal training by stating "If you do, you should learn more than I ever did, but you will never have so good a time." Robert Lincoln attended Harvard Law School from September 1864 to January 1865, but left after four months in order to join the Union Army. In 1893, Harvard awarded Lincoln the honorary degree of LL.D.

Much to the embarrassment of the president, Mary Todd Lincoln prevented Robert Lincoln from joining the Army until shortly before the war's conclusion. "We have lost one son, and his loss is as much as I can bear, without being called upon to make another sacrifice," Mary Todd Lincoln insisted to President Lincoln. President Lincoln argued "our son is not more dear to us than the sons of other people are to their mothers." However, Mary Todd Lincoln persisted by stating that she could not "bear to have Robert exposed to danger." In January 1865, the First Lady gave in and President Lincoln wrote Ulysses Grant, asking if Robert could be placed on his staff.

On February 11, 1865, Lincoln was commissioned as an assistant adjutant with a captain's rank. He served in the last weeks of the American Civil War on General Grant's staff, which meant he probably would not be involved in any actual combat; regardless, his father was very proud. He was present at Appomattox when Lee surrendered. He resigned his commission on June 12, 1865, and returned to civilian life.

Lincoln was once saved from possible serious injury or death by Edwin Booth, whose brother, John Wilkes Booth, assassinated Robert's father. This event took place on a train platform in Jersey City, New Jersey. The exact date is uncertain, but it is believed to have taken place in late 1863 or early 1864, before John Wilkes Booth's assassination of President Lincoln (April 14, 1865). In a letter written in 1909 to the editor of The Century Magazine, Robert Lincoln recalled what had happened that day:

Months afterwards, while serving on Grant's US Army staff, Robert Lincoln recalled the occurrence to Colonel Adam Badeau, a fellow officer who happened to be a friend of Edwin Booth's. Badeau sent a letter to Booth, complimenting the actor for his heroism. Before receiving the letter, Booth had been unaware that the man whose life he had saved on the train platform was the president's son. The knowledge of who he had saved that day was said to have been of some comfort to Booth following his brother's assassination of the president. Grant also sent Booth a letter of gratitude for his action.

Some commentators believe that Lincoln had a distant relationship with his father, in part because, during his formative years, Abraham Lincoln spent months on the judicial circuit. Lincoln recalled, "During my childhood and early youth he was almost constantly away from home, attending court or making political speeches." David Herbert Donald quoted Robert as saying that his most vivid image of his father was of packing saddlebags to prepare for his travels through Illinois. Donald's opinion seems to be based on the writings of Lincoln biographer Frederick Trevor Hill and scholar Wayne C. Temple. Hill would write that "The Hon. Robert Lincoln told the writer that he distinctly remembers seeing his father start out on horseback, with his saddle-bags, to accompany the judge on the circuit." Robert’s memory of the saddlebags has been changed from his personal "distinctly remembers" (Hill in 1906) to "the first memory" (Temple in 1960), then in 1995 becoming "the principal memory" of his childhood in Donald's Lincoln.
Abraham, on his part, knew that his being away had a potential impact on his sons – he was always anxious to see his children and spend time with them, as evidenced by the following quote from his April 16, 1848, letter to his wife: "don’t let the blessed fellows forget Father". One such example that gives insight into his father's indulgence and childhood in general was related by Joseph Humphreys, who had taken a train to Lexington in 1847: "there were two lively youngsters on board who kept the whole train in a turmoil, and their long-legged father, instead of spanking the brats, looked pleased as Punch and aided and abetted the older one in mischief".

Robert, although private about intimate family details, shared the same bond with his father as his brothers had. Robert deeply admired his father and wept openly at his deathbed. Robert fought to preserve and protect his father's legacy, clashing with Lincoln biographer William Herndon over Herndon's statements about his famous father. As a result of their confrontations over his Lincoln biography, in 1890 Herndon wrote to Jesse Weik, his Lincoln biography collaborator, that Robert was "a Todd and not a Lincoln ... a little bitter fellow of the pig-headed kind, silly and cold and selfish."

On the night of his father's death, Robert had turned down an invitation to accompany his parents to Ford's Theatre, citing fatigue after spending much of his recent time in a covered wagon at the battlefront.

On April 25, 1865, Robert Lincoln wrote President Andrew Johnson requesting that he and his family be allowed to stay for two and a half weeks because his mother had told him that "she can not possibly be ready to leave here." Lincoln also acknowledged that he was aware of the "great inconvenience" that Johnson had since becoming president of the United States only a short time earlier. Following his father's assassination, in April 1865 Robert moved to the city of Chicago with his remaining family. He attended law classes at the Old University of Chicago – now Northwestern University Pritzker School of Law – and studied law at the Chicago firm of Scammon, McCagg & Fuller. On January 1, 1866, Lincoln moved out of the apartment he shared with his mother and brother. He rented his own rooms in downtown Chicago to "begin to live with some degree of comfort" which he had not known when living in cramped conditions with his family. Lincoln graduated from Northwestern University with an LL.B. in 1866 and became licensed as an attorney in Chicago on February 22, 1867. He was certified to practice law four days later on February 26, 1867.

Family

Marriage and children
On September 24, 1868, Lincoln married the former Mary Eunice Harlan (1846–1937), daughter of Senator James Harlan and Ann Eliza Peck of Mount Pleasant, Iowa. They had three children, two daughters and one son.

In an era before air conditioning, Robert, Mary, and the children would often leave their hot city life behind for the cooler climate of Mt. Pleasant. During the 1880s the family would summer at the Harlan home. The Harlan-Lincoln home, built in 1876, still stands today. Donated by Mary Harlan Lincoln to Iowa Wesleyan College in 1907, it now serves as a museum containing a collection of artifacts from the Lincoln family and from Abraham Lincoln's presidency.

Of Robert's children, Jessie Harlan Lincoln Beckwith (1875–1948) had two children, but neither of them (Mary Lincoln Beckwith ("Peggy" 1898–1975) nor Robert Todd Lincoln Beckwith ("Bud") (1904–1985)) had children of their own. Robert's other daughter, Mary Todd Lincoln ("Mamie") (1869–1938) married Charles Bradford Isham in 1891. They had one son, Lincoln Isham (1892–1971), who married Leahalma Correa in 1919, but died without children.

The last person acknowledged and known to be of direct Lincoln lineage, Robert's grandson Robert Todd Lincoln Beckwith, died in 1985.

Relationship with Mary Todd Lincoln
In 1871, tragedy beset the family again when Lincoln's only surviving brother, Tad, died at the age of 18, leaving his mother devastated with grief. Lincoln was already concerned about what he thought were his mother's "spend-thrift" ways, hallucinations, paranoia, and increasingly eccentric behaviors and thoughts. Fearing that she was a danger to herself, he arranged to have her committed to a psychiatric hospital in Batavia, Illinois, in 1875. With his mother in the hospital, he was left with control of her finances, although he used his own money to pay for her care. As the head of the family, he felt that it was his duty to protect her, although he did wish that she would have “every liberty and privilege” restored to her as soon as she was better. On May 20, 1875, she arrived at Bellevue Place, a private, upscale sanitarium in the Fox River Valley.

Three months after she started living there, Mary Lincoln was able to escape from Bellevue Place. She smuggled letters to her lawyer, James B. Bradwell, and his wife, Myra, who was Mary's friend as well as a feminist lawyer and spiritualist. Mary also wrote to the editor of the Chicago Times and shortly, the embarrassment Robert had hoped to avoid came to the forefront, with his motives and character being publicly questioned. Bellevue's director, who at Mary's commitment trial assured the jury she would benefit from treatment at his facility, in the face of the publicity declared her well enough to go to Springfield to live with her sister. Her commitment and subsequent events alienated Lincoln from his mother, and they did not possibly reconcile until shortly before her unexpected death from a stroke.

Politics

Secretary of War (1881–1885)
From 1876 to 1877 Lincoln served as Town Supervisor of South Chicago, a town which was later absorbed into the city of Chicago. In 1877 he rejected President Rutherford B. Hayes' offer to appoint him Assistant Secretary of State. He subsequently accepted being appointed by President James Garfield as Secretary of War and served from 1881 to 1885 under Garfield and then Chester A. Arthur.

During his term in office, the Cincinnati Riots of 1884 broke out over a case in which a jury gave a verdict of manslaughter rather than murder in a case that many suspected was rigged. Forty-five people died during three days of rioting before U.S. troops dispatched by Lincoln reestablished calm.

Subsequent to serving as Secretary of War, Lincoln assisted Oscar Dudley to establish the Illinois Industrial Training School for Boys in Norwood Park in 1887, after Dudley (a Humane Society employee) "discovered more homeless, neglected and abused boys than dogs on the city streets." The school relocated to Glenwood, Illinois, in 1890. It went through several name changes, and is now called Glenwood Academy.

Republican politics

From 1884 to 1912, Lincoln's name was mentioned in varying degrees of seriousness as a candidate for the Republican presidential or vice-presidential nomination. At every turn, he adamantly disavowed any interest in running and stated he would not accept nomination for either position. His likeness was included in an 1888 set of "Presidential Possibilties" cards.

Minister to the Court of St James's
Lincoln served as the U.S. minister to the United Kingdom, formally the Court of St James's, from 1889 to 1893 under President Benjamin Harrison. Lincoln's teenage son, Abraham II "Jack", died during this time in Europe. After serving as minister, Lincoln returned to private business as a lawyer.

Later life and career

Lincoln was general counsel of the Pullman Palace Car Company under George Pullman, and was named president after Pullman's death in 1897. According to Almont Lindsey's 1942 book, The Pullman Strike, Lincoln arranged to have Pullman quietly excused from the subpoena issued for Pullman to testify in the 1895 trials of the leaders of the American Railway Union for conspiracy during the 1894 Pullman strike. Pullman hid from the deputy marshal sent to his office with the subpoena and then appeared with Lincoln to meet privately with Judge Grosscup after the jury had been dismissed. In 1911, Lincoln became chairman of the Pullman Company board, a position he held until 1924.

A serious nonprofessional astronomer, Lincoln had an observatory built at Hildene, and a 1909 Warner & Swaseyrefracting telescope with a six-inch John A. Brashear objective lens was installed. Lincoln's telescope and observatory have been restored and it was used by a local astronomy club in the early 2000s.

Lincoln was also a dedicated golfer, and served as president of the Ekwanok Country Club in Manchester.

Robert Lincoln's last public appearance was on May 30, 1922 at the dedication ceremony for his father's memorial in Washington, D.C.

Presence at assassinations
Robert Lincoln was coincidentally either present or nearby when three presidential assassinations occurred.
 Lincoln was not present at Ford's Theatre when his father was assassinated but he was at the White House nearby, and rushed to be with his parents. The president was moved to the Petersen House after the shooting, where Robert attended his father's deathbed.
 Lincoln was an eyewitness when Charles J. Guiteau shot President James A. Garfield at the Sixth Street Train Station in Washington, D.C., on July 2, 1881. Lincoln was serving as Garfield's Secretary of War at the time.
 Lincoln was at the Pan-American Exposition in Buffalo, New York when President William McKinley was shot by Leon Czolgosz. Though not an eyewitness, he was just outside the building when the shooting actually occurred.

Lincoln himself recognized these coincidences. He is said to have refused a later presidential invitation with the comment, "No, I'm not going, and they'd better not ask me, because there is a certain fatality about presidential functions when I am present."

Death
Robert Todd Lincoln died in his sleep at Hildene, his Vermont home, on July 26, 1926, five days before he was due to turn 83. The cause of death was given by his physician as a "cerebral hemorrhage induced by arteriosclerosis".

Robert had long expressed his intention to be buried in the Lincoln Tomb with his family at the Oak Ridge Cemetery in Springfield. Two weeks after his death, his widow Mary Harlan Lincoln, suddenly became inspired: "...[O]ur darling was a personage, made his own history, independently of his great father, and should have his own place 'in the sun'".

Lincoln's body was buried at Arlington National Cemetery in a sarcophagus designed by the sculptor James Earle Fraser. He is buried together with his wife, Mary, and their son, Abraham II ("Jack"), who had died in London, England, of sepsis in 1890 at the age of 16. Weeks after Jack's death, Robert wrote to his cousin Charles Edwards, "We had a long & most anxious struggle and at times had hopes of saving our boy. It would have been done if it had depended only on his own marvelous pluck & patience now that the end has come, there is a great blank in our future lives & an affliction not to be measured."

Legacy

According to historian Michael Burlingame, historians typically consider Robert Todd Lincoln, "a particularly unfortunate, even tragic figure." Lincoln once said, "No one wanted me for Secretary of War... For minister to England... For president of the Pullman Company; they wanted Abraham Lincoln's son." Nevertheless, he accepted the appointments and was very well-paid, becoming a millionaire lawyer and businessman, fond of the pleasures of the wealthy conservative Victorian gentlemen of his social circle. He had little in common with his father personally or politically – he was not humorous or unpretentious, but rather cold, stuffy, and aloof.

Fanny Seward, daughter of secretary of state William H. Seward, described him as "ready and easy in conversation having, I fancy, considerable humor in his disposition...agreeable, good-natured, and intelligent".

Lincoln was the last surviving member of both the Garfield and Arthur Cabinets, and the last surviving witness of Lee's surrender at Appomattox. The Lincoln Sea, a body of water in the Arctic Ocean between Canada and Greenland, was named after then Secretary of War Lincoln on Adolphus Greely's 1881–1884 Arctic expedition.

Cultural depictions
Robert Todd Lincoln as a character has appeared multiple times on film, in television programs, and in dramatic productions.

Films
 Edwin Mills in Abe Lincoln in Illinois (1940)
 Joseph Gordon Levitt in Steven Spielberg's Lincoln (2012)

Television
 Kieran Mulroney in Tad (1995)
 Gregory Cooke in the miniseries Lincoln (1988)
 Wil Wheaton in The Day Lincoln Was Shot (1998)
 Brett Dalton in Killing Lincoln (2013)
 Neal Bledsoe in Timeless (2016)
 James Carroll Jordan in Sandburg's Lincoln (1974), with Hal Holbrook as Abraham Lincoln.
 Nick Robinson in History of the World, Part II (2023)

Stage plays
 Michael Cristofer in The Last of Mrs. Lincoln (1976). The Last of Mrs. Lincoln, starring Julie Harris, was also seen on television, on PBS as part of a series called Hollywood Television Theater.

See also
 List of people on the cover of Time Magazine: 1920s – March 8, 1926
 Lincoln family tree

References

Bibliography
 
 
 Cooper, Dan. "President Lincoln of the Pullman Company," Financial History (Fall 2013), Issue 108, pp 10–39.
 
 Goff, John S. Robert Todd Lincoln: a man in his own right (University of Oklahoma Press, 1968) online free to borrow

External links

 Robert Todd Lincoln
 Photographs of Robert Todd Lincoln
 Original Letters and Manuscripts: Robert Todd Lincoln Shapell Manuscript Foundation

1843 births
1926 deaths
19th-century American diplomats
Amateur astronomers
Ambassadors of the United States to the United Kingdom
American people of English descent
Arthur administration cabinet members
19th-century American politicians
Burials at Arlington National Cemetery
Children of presidents of the United States
Garfield administration cabinet members
Harvard Law School alumni
Harvard College alumni
Illinois city council members
Illinois lawyers
Illinois Republicans
Lincoln family
People associated with the assassination of Abraham Lincoln
People of Illinois in the American Civil War
Phillips Exeter Academy alumni
Politicians from Springfield, Illinois
Union Army officers
United States Secretaries of War
People from Manchester, Vermont